Amanda Lawrence is a British stage, film, and television actress.

Lawrence studied theatre at Bretton Hall College and worked early in her career in the Edinburgh Fringe. She then moved to London and appeared in theatrical productions such as Brief Encounter, Playing the Victim, and The Firework-Maker's Daughter. She led the stage production of Jiggery Pokery in London in 2009.

In the 2010s she appeared in several television shows, including Above Suspicion, Dead Boss, Midsomer Murders “A Rare Bird” 2012 as Olivia Carter and Mr Selfridge. She also took roles in films, including Womb (2010) and Suffragette (2015). She appeared in a National Theatre production of Angels in America in 2017, and later that year took the role of Resistance commander Larma D'Acy in Star Wars: The Last Jedi, and reprised the role in Star Wars: The Rise of Skywalker. In 2019, she appeared in a London production of Top Girls.

In 2020, she played Barbara Farrell in “The Fall of the House of St Gardner”, S8:E9 of Father Brown and in September 2020, she played DC Sarah Raymond in ITV's two-part television drama, Honour. She also appeared in White House Farm (2020) as Barbara Wilson.

References

External links

Living people
British actresses
1971 births